The Fayetteville Metropolitan Statistical Area, as defined by the US Office of Management and Budget (OMB), is an area consisting of three counties – Cumberland, Harnett, and Hoke – in eastern North Carolina, anchored by the city of Fayetteville. It is served by Interstate 95, Interstate 295, U.S. and state highways, Fayetteville Regional Airport, Amtrak, Greyhound, Megabus and several railroad systems. As of the 2000 census, the MSA had a population of 336,609. As of the 2010 census the MSA had a population of 366,383. In 2011 the estimated population was 374,157. The 2019 estimated population is 526,719.

Counties and populations

Communities
Places with more than 100,000 inhabitants
Fayetteville (Principal city)
Places with 10,000 to 30,000 inhabitants
Fort Bragg – In the 2000 Census, Fort Bragg was a "census designated place." This means it was an unincorporated place that the Census Bureau recognized and designated as an identifiable community worthy of data tabulation. However, Fort Bragg was no longer designated as a "census designated place" in the 2010 Census, because the part of Fort Bragg in Cumberland County was annexed by Fayetteville and Spring Lake in 2008 (through an annexation adopted by the NC General Assembly).
Hope Mills
Spring Lake
Places with 1,000 to 10,000 inhabitants
Dunn 
Eastover
Raeford
Rockfish
Vander
Silver City
Places with less than 1,000 inhabitants
Ashley Heights
Bowmore
Dundarrach
Falcon (partial)
Five Points
Godwin
Linden
Stedman
Wade

Transportation
Interstate 95
Interstate 295
 U.S. and state highways
Fayetteville Regional Airport
Amtrak
Greyhound
Megabus
Several railroad systems

Demographics
According to the latest figures from the U.S. Census Bureau, there were 366,383 people, 143,306 households and 88,722 families residing within the MSA. The racial makeup of the MSA was 54.09% White, 35.17% African American, 2.54% Native American, 1.77% Asian, 0.28% Pacific Islander, 3.14% from other races, and 3.00% from two or more races. Hispanic or Latino of any race were 6.93% of the population.

The median income for a household in the MSA was $44,757, and the median income for a family was $54,895. Males had a median income of $38,958 versus $32,078 for females. The per capita income for the MSA was $22,856.

See also
North Carolina census statistical areas
List of cities, towns, and villages in North Carolina
List of unincorporated communities in North Carolina

References

 
Geography of Cumberland County, North Carolina
Geography of Hoke County, North Carolina
Metropolitan areas of North Carolina